Maple Valley Township is the name of some places in the U.S. state of Michigan:

 Maple Valley Township, Montcalm County, Michigan
 Maple Valley Township, Sanilac County, Michigan

Michigan township disambiguation pages